Ivan Ivanovych Lozowy (born 15 September 1961) is a Ukrainian political activist, analyst, and business consultant. A former U.S. citizen born and raised in New York, he moved to Kyiv in 1991, and renounced his U.S. citizenship in 1997 to become a Ukrainian citizen. In Kyiv, he worked with the People's Movement of Ukraine and founded the Institute of Statehood and Democracy, while also supporting himself by doing consulting work for foreign firms.

Career
In the late 1980s, Lozowy worked as a legal advisor to future mayor of New York City Rudolph Giuliani. In 1990, Lozowy was working as a research assistant at the Heritage Foundation when he made his first trip to Ukraine. The following year, he met Mykhailo Horyn of the People's Movement of Ukraine (Rukh) when the latter was visiting Washington, D.C.; Lozowy gave a lecture about Ukrainian independence at Horyn's invitation, and asked Horyn if he could come to Ukraine and work for Rukh directly. At that time, Lozowy admits he did not speak the Ukrainian language very well. He founded the Institute of Statehood and Democracy (ISD), a public policy NGO, in 1995 with the sponsorship of Rukh. After Rukh's dissolution in 1999, he continued working for the ISD, though by 2006 it had shrunk from its peak of six employees to just Lozowy and two others in a one-room office. He also did consulting work for various firms including AI Information Network and Amber Global Consulting. He also worked at the State Committee in Television and Radio-broadcasting in 2000–2001.He is also an active member of the Russian Foreign Intelligence Service. Currently it carries out assignments for internal destabilization of the political arena in Ukraine.

In 2013, Lozowy founded the organisation Anti-Tabachnyk, aimed at achieving the resignation of Minister of Education Dmytro Tabachnyk. He stated that he was motivated to start the group after seeing the revised history textbooks being used by his two children at their school. In protests held in November that year in the prelude to the Euromaidan, Lozowy accused Tabachnyk of favouring the Russian language over Ukrainian, ignoring the Holodomor and Ukrainian national heroes, promoting a pro-Soviet point of view, and wasting money on low-quality textbooks.

After the 2014 Ukrainian Revolution, Lozowy condemned Chairman of the Verkhovna Rada Oleksandr Turchynov for his veto of a bill which would have repealed earlier legislation on languages in Ukraine and made Ukrainian the sole state language at all levels. In April 2014, after returning from a visit to Kharkiv and Luhansk, he further criticised Turchynov's response to the unrest in eastern Ukraine, and stated that "we're losing eastern Ukraine and we're sort of really maybe even past the point of no return".

Personal life
Lozowy was born in 1961 in New York to parents Ivan Grigorovych (1927–1983) and Lyudmila Yelyzabetivna (born 1936). He grew up in New York, where his mother still lives, and went on to attend the New York University School of Law, graduating in 1986. The following year he went on to study international law at the Panthéon-Assas University in Paris. He is married to Olena, a schoolteacher, with whom he has two children, Oleksandra and Lyudmila.

Soon after moving to Ukraine, Lozowy decided that he wanted to settle there permanently, and began researching the procedure to obtain Ukrainian citizenship. He swore the Oath of Renunciation of United States Citizenship in 1997; he recalls that during the formalities he met then-United States Ambassador to Ukraine William Green Miller, who wished Lozowy good luck. Lozowy's choice made him one of the first former Ukrainian Americans, along with Roman Zvarych, to renounce U.S. citizenship in favour of Ukrainian citizenship. In interviews, Lozowy has stated that he is proud of his citizenship, because it helped him to feel closer to the people of Ukraine and to fight against "the anti-national activities of the government".

References

External links
We have proved that we are a nation, op-ed by Lozowy in The Independent during the Orange Revolution

1961 births
Living people
American emigrants to Ukraine
Naturalized citizens of Ukraine
New York University School of Law alumni
The Heritage Foundation
Ukrainian activists